Dale is a ghost town in Custer County, Nebraska, United States.

History
A post office was established at Dale in 1883, and remained in operation until 1894. The community was named for Samuel Dale, a pioneer.

References

Geography of Custer County, Nebraska
Ghost towns in Nebraska